The British Champions Series is a series of 35 top British flat races, which culminates in a day-long festival of championship races, known as British Champions Day.  It was inaugurated in the 2011 season to draw together some of Britain's key flat races into a meaningful championship, with the hope of generating coverage and stimulating interest among the more casual sports fan.  It was believed to have achieved its aims based on an increase of 7% attendance at the race days that were part of the 2011 series, as opposed to a 3.9% increase in attendances across the season's race programme as a whole.

The championships have been sponsored by the Qatari investment group QIPCO since its inception in 2011. In June 2015 QIPCO renewed their sponsorship until at least 2024 in a deal worth more than £50m, the biggest sponsorship deal ever for British horse racing.

The series is split into five divisions - Sprint, Mile, Middle Distance, Long Distance and Fillies & Mares. This series includes all Group One races in Great Britain, except those limited to two year old horses.

Races

Sprint

Mile

Middle Distance

Long Distance

Fillies & Mares

See also

List of British flat horse races

References

External links
British Champions Series Official Site

 
Flat races in Great Britain
Racing series for horses
Recurring sporting events established in 2011
2011 establishments in the United Kingdom